Cave of a Thousand Tales: The Life and Times of Pulp Author Hugh B. Cave is a biography of Hugh B. Cave written by Milt Thomas. It was released in 2004 by Arkham House in an edition of approximately 2,500 copies.  It was Thomas' first book published by Arkham House.  The book was nominated for an International Horror Guild Award in 2004.

References

2004 non-fiction books
American biographies
Arkham House books